Dicentria is a genus of moths of the family Notodontidae. The genus contains about 46 described species occurring from Mexico south to Bolivia and Paraguay. Its affinities to the North American genera Schizura and Oligocentria are not fully understood.

Selected species
Dicentria argyroma Miller, 2011
Dicentria centralis (Herrich-Schäffer, 1855)
Dicentria cymatila Miller, 2011
Dicentria violascens (Herrich-Schäffer, 1855)

References

Notodontidae